The 1930 Brooklyn Robins were in first place from mid-May through mid-August but faded down the stretch and finished the season in fourth place.

Offseason 
 February 5, 1930: Doug McWeeny was traded by the Robins to the Cincinnati Reds for Dolf Luque.

Regular season 
This team featured one of the best offensive players in the game in Babe Herman and one of the best pitchers in Hall of Famer Dazzy Vance. Herman was arguably the second-best National League hitter in 1930, after Hack Wilson. He finished in the top three in batting average, on-base percentage, and slugging percentage.

Vance was even more impressive. He led the NL in ERA by more than a full run, at 2.61. Considering that 1930 was a great year for hitters, statistically, this number is far better than it actually seems. Vance was also second in strikeouts and anchored a pitching staff that allowed the fewest runs in the league.

Season standings

Record vs. opponents

Roster

Player stats

Batting

Starters by position 
Note: Pos = Position; G = Games played; AB = At bats; R = Runs; H = Hits; Avg. = Batting average; HR = Home runs; RBI = Runs batted in; SB = Stolen bases

Other batters 
Note: G = Games played; AB = At bats; R = Runs; H = Hits; Avg. = Batting average; HR = Home runs; RBI = Runs batted in; SB = Stolen bases

Pitching

Starting pitchers 
Note: G = Games pitched; GS = Games started; CG = Complete games; IP = Innings pitched; W = Wins; L = Losses; ERA = Earned run average; BB = Bases on balls; SO = Strikeouts

Other pitchers 
Note: G = Games pitched; GS = Games started; CG = Complete games; IP = Innings pitched; W = Wins; L = Losses; ERA = Earned run average; BB = Bases on balls; SO = Strikeouts

Relief pitchers 
Note: G = Games pitched; IP = Innings pitched; W = Wins; L = Losses; SV = Saves; ERA = Earned run average; BB = Bases on balls; SO = Strikeouts

Awards and honors

League top five finishers 
Babe Herman
 #2 in NL in batting average (.393)
 #2 in NL in on-base percentage (.455)
 #3 in NL in slugging percentage (.678)
 #3 in NL in doubles (48)
 #4 in NL in RBI (130)

Dazzy Vance
 Led NL in ERA (2.61)
 #3 in NL in strikeouts (173)

Notes

References 
Baseball-Reference season page
Baseball Almanac season page

External links 
1930 Brooklyn Robins uniform
Brooklyn Dodgers reference site
Acme Dodgers page 
Retrosheet

Los Angeles Dodgers seasons
Brooklyn Robins season
Brooklyn
1930s in Brooklyn
Flatbush, Brooklyn